Rugrats is an American animated television series created by Arlene Klasky, Gábor Csupó, and Paul Germain for Nickelodeon. The show focuses on a group of babies; most prominently—Tommy, Chuckie, Angelica, and twins Phil and Lil, and their day-to-day lives, usually involving life experiences that become much greater adventures in the imaginations of the main characters.

The series premiered on August 11, 1991, as the second Nicktoon—after Doug and before The Ren & Stimpy Show, with an initial installment of 65 episodes spanning three seasons. Rugrats would also become the first of the "Big Three" of the Nicktoons, along with SpongeBob SquarePants and The Fairly OddParents. Production was then halted in 1993 with the last episode airing on November 12, 1994. In 1995 and 1996, two Jewish-themed specials premiered; "A Rugrats Passover" and "A Rugrats Chanukah", respectively, both of which received critical acclaim. During this time, after the end of the show's production run, Rugrats began to receive a boost in ratings and popularity due to constant reruns on Nickelodeon.

In 1996, Klasky Csupo began producing new episodes, and the show's fourth season began in 1997. As a result of the show's popularity, a series of theatrical films were released over the next five years: The Rugrats Movie, which introduced Tommy's younger brother Dil, was released in 1998; Rugrats in Paris: The Movie, which introduced Chuckie's stepmother Kira, his stepsister Kimi, and poodle Fifi, was released in 2000; and Rugrats Go Wild, a crossover film with another Klasky Csupo series, The Wild Thornberrys, was released in 2003. The final episode aired on August 1, 2004, bringing the series to a total of 172 episodes over nine seasons. The 13-year run ties Rugrats with King of the Hill as the eighth-longest-running American animated television series. The show is Nickelodeon's third longest-running animated series, behind SpongeBob SquarePants and The Fairly OddParents. It is one of the longest-running animated series of all time.

On July 21, 2001, Nickelodeon broadcast the made-for-TV special All Growed Up to celebrate the 10th anniversary of the series. The special was a pilot for the Rugrats sequel series All Grown Up!, which aired from 2003 to 2008. It chronicles the lives of the babies and their parents after they age 10 years. A spin-off series, Rugrats Pre-School Daze, aired four episodes in 2008. Two direct-to-video specials were released in 2005 and 2006 under the title Rugrats: Tales from the Crib. Tie-in media for the series include video games, comics, toys, and various other merchandise.

Rugrats gained over 20 awards during its 13-year run, including four Daytime Emmy Awards, six Kids' Choice Awards, and its own star on the Hollywood Walk of Fame. The series became a hit, garnering high ratings, and anchored Nickelodeon as the network's top-rated show from 1995 to 2001. Until SpongeBob SquarePants aired its 173rd episode in 2012, Rugrats was Nickelodeon's longest-running cartoon.

A reboot of the series executive-produced by the original creative team of Klasky, Csupó, and Germain premiered on Paramount+ on May 27, 2021.

Premise

Setting

Many of the adventures the babies find themselves in take place at Tommy's house; the parents usually rely on Didi, Stu, or Grandpa Lou to babysit the kids while they run errands. Their address is revealed on an invoice in "Tommy's First Birthday" (season one, 1991) as 1258 N. Highland, the original address of Klasky Csupo in Los Angeles. However, an unnamed specific city or state is never mentioned in the show. Several indicators, such as a state flag at a post office, license plate designs on the vehicles, and various trips to the Grand Canyon, Las Vegas, and the beach, place the characters somewhere in southern California. 

The location is also hinted at during "Little Dude" (season-one, 1991) when Didi, who is a teacher, takes Tommy to her class at Eucaipah High School, referencing the city of Yucaipa, California. It has been implied that this ambiguity was done intentionally to help give the impression of seeing the world through the eyes of the babies, who would not understand the concept of location. The DeVilles live next door to the Pickles and, early in the series, the Carmichaels move in across the street.

Characters

The series focuses on the experiences of a courageous, adventurous one-year-old baby named Tommy Pickles and his group of playmates – several other infants and toddlers, some of whom debuted later in the series. His playmates include Chuckie, Tommy's bespectacled, red-headed, insecure, cowardly two-year-old best friend, the twins Phil and Lil, noted for their revolting eccentricities, Tommy's baby brother Dil, who was born in The Rugrats Movie, Angelica, Tommy and Dil's outrageously spoiled and selfish three-year-old cousin who is a "rival" of his friends, Kimi, Chuckie's adventurous, playful stepsister (later his adopted sister in the seventh-season episode "Finsterella") who is introduced in Rugrats in Paris; and Susie, a good-hearted neighbor of the Pickles family.

The other characters depicted in Rugrats include the babies' parents, grandparents, and pets. Parental figures include Didi and Stu Pickles, Tommy and Dil's mother and father, Chas Finster, Chuckie's stereotypically nerdy and mild-mannered father, Kira, Chuckie's sweet-natured, kind and understanding stepmother (later his adopted mother) whom Chas marries in Rugrats in Paris, Drew Pickles, Angelica's indulgent and doting father, Charlotte Pickles, Angelica's workaholic mother, Betty DeVille, Phil and Lil's kind and boisterous feminist mother, and Howard DeVille, the twins' mild-mannered and soft-spoken father. Grandparents include Lou Pickles, Drew and Stu's father and Tommy, Angelica, and Dil's grandfather, Lulu, Lou's second elderly wife that appeared in later seasons of the show, and Didi's parents, Boris and Minka, who are Jewish immigrants. The Pickles family also own a dog named Spike and a cat named Fluffy.

In the series, babies talk to each other whenever adults are either not around, or are not paying attention. The babies have a limited understanding of the world. Toddlers Angelica and Susie talk to the babies as well but can also communicate with adults, as they act as a bridge between the two worlds.

Episodes
During the first six seasons of Rugrats, shows were primarily divided into two eleven-minute episodes. After the second movie, during season seven, Rugrats aired with a format of three episodes per show, though it returned to its original two-episode-per-show format in the final two seasons.

Production
Episodes took up to a year in advance to produce. After the episode's story was written and approved, the next phase consisted of voice recording, storyboarding, pre-eliminating animation, overseas production, overseas delivery, followed by editing and polishing.

Development

Rugrats was formed by the then-husband-and-wife duo of Gábor Csupó and Arlene Klasky, along with Paul Germain in 1989. Klasky Csupo had a major animation firm at the time which also provided services for commercials and music videos. Klasky, Csupó, and Germain were also animating The Simpsons for Matt Groening at the time, which they would continue to do until 1992 when the show's producer James L. Brooks and his company Gracie Films switched domestic production to Film Roman. The trio decided to create their own series in reaction to a proclamation by the children's cable network Nickelodeon that they were to launch their own line of animated shows, which would be later called "Nicktoons". The network's Vice President of Animation Vanessa Coffey approached them to create a pilot for their new series. With the comedic stimulation branching from the antics of Klasky and Csupó's infant children, the 6–minute pilot episode, "Tommy Pickles and the Great White Thing" (which never aired), was released on DVD by Paramount Home Entertainment in 2001.

Peter Chung, along with Klasky and Csupó, co-designed the characters and directed the series pilot, as well as the opening sequence. In a Decider article, Chung said, "He [Gábor] wanted the babies to be 'strange' instead of 'cute.'" The production was completed in 1990, and they submitted it to Nickelodeon, who tested it with an audience of children. The feedback for the pilot episode was primarily positive. With that, Coffey and then-network president Geraldine Laybourne approved of and bought the series and sent it into production. Chuckie and Angelica were added as characters.

Germain, who felt that the series needed a bully, based Angelica on a girl bully from his childhood and decided the character would be a spoiled brat. Klasky initially disliked Angelica and also protested her actions in episodes like "Barbecue Story", where she throws Tommy's ball over the fence. In a New Yorker article, Klasky said, "I think she's a bully. I never liked Angelica." Klasky disdained Angelica and never fully approved of her character development. Angelica became problematic for some Rugrats staff. When her voice actress, Cheryl Chase, had problems portraying a mean Angelica, Steve Viksten, one of the writers, would mention that Angelica was the series' J. R. Ewing. After seeing Angelica in The Rugrats Movie, Klasky commented, "I think she's great for the show; I love Angelica."

Writing 
According to Germain, when the series was first conceived, the rule was that babies can really talk, but keep it a secret from adults. However, the rules quickly began to evolve, and the babies became a metaphor for children of all ages. During production of the first season, Germain and his fellow writers would argue among themselves over whether the adults could not understand the babies' talking, or whether the babies only spoke to each other when adults were not around. During the first season, they tried a little of both, although later in the season, the writers would have the babies talk to each other while adults were in the same room, as long as there was a lot of space between them. By the end of the season, the writers allowed the babies to talk to each other while in their strollers as long as adults were not in the same shot.

Voice actors
Through its full run, Rugrats had a steady array of main voice actors. E. G. Daily voices Tommy Pickles, except in the unaired pilot where Tami Holbrook provides the voice; Christine Cavanaugh originally voiced Chuckie Finster, but Cavanaugh left the show for personal reasons and was subsequently replaced by Nancy Cartwright in 2002. The fraternal twins, Phil and Lil, and their mother, Betty, are voiced by Kath Soucie; Dil Pickles and Timmy McNulty are voiced by Tara Strong. Cheryl Chase, who initially auditioned for the role of Tommy, was brought on board to be cast as the voice of Angelica Pickles. Dionne Quan voices Kimi Finster. Susie is voiced by Cree Summer except for two episodes when Summer was not available; Daily filled in for her. Other regular voice actors include Melanie Chartoff as Didi Pickles, Jack Riley as Stu Pickles, Tress MacNeille as Charlotte Pickles, Michael Bell as Drew Pickles and Chas Finster, Julia Kato as Kira Finster, Hattie Winston as Dr. Lucy Carmichael, 
Ron Glass as Randy Carmichael and David Doyle as Grandpa Lou Pickles until his death in 1997, after which Joe Alaskey took over until the series' end. In 2000, Debbie Reynolds joined the cast as Lulu Pickles, Lou's second wife, and remained until the series' end.

Animation 
Overseas animation for the series was done at Wang Film Productions for the first-season, Shanghai Morning Sun Animation for the pilot and its first-season, and Anivision and Sunwoo Entertainment for the rest of the series. It was followed by editing and polishing before its master tapes were sent to Nickelodeon.

Themes
Rugrats visualizes ordinary, everyday activities through the eyes of a group of toddlers. Using their imaginations, the babies transform routine tasks into surprising adventures. The babies, having a limited understanding of the world, constantly mispronounce words and use improper grammar. Challenges often emerge because the babies misinterpret the adults, usually caused by Angelica's deceptive translations. The grown-ups of Rugrats are simultaneously quirky, over-cautious, and oblivious. The series portrays adults as mysterious eccentrics. Episodes usually center on a moral lesson that the babies learn during their imaginative explorations.

Release

Broadcast 
Rugrats was Nickelodeon's second Nicktoon, debuting on the same day as Doug (which premiered before it) and The Ren & Stimpy Show (which debuted after). After the first run of the series, which was produced from 1990 to 1993, production went on a hiatus, and episodes that had not yet premiered continued to be released through 1994. In 1995 and 1996, two Jewish-themed specials premiered; "A Rugrats Passover" and "A Rugrats Chanukah", respectively, and the rest of the series aired in reruns. Production on new episodes restarted in 1996, and the show aired in Nickelodeon's SNICK block from 1997 to 2001. From 1994 until 2012, Rugrats was the longest-running Nickelodeon animated series, with 172 episodes produced across its 13-year run. This record was surpassed in 2012 by SpongeBob SquarePants with the episode "Squiditis/Demolition Doofus".

On July 21, 2001, in celebration of its 10th anniversary, Nickelodeon aired the television movie All Growed Up, which featured the characters ten years older. After the special, the network aired a retrospective titled Rugrats: Still Babies After All These Years, narrated by Amanda Bynes. Because of the special's ratings and popularity, Nickelodeon commissioned All Grown Up!, a series about the older characters, which ran from 2003 to 2008. Rugrats ended on August 11, 2004.

Home media
Nickelodeon and Amazon.com struck a deal to produce DVDs of new and old Nickelodeon shows, through the CreateSpace service. Using a concept similar to print on demand, Amazon made the discs, cover art, and disc art itself. The first and second seasons of Rugrats were released on June 2, 2009, along with the first and second seasons of The Fairly OddParents (although the Rugrats Season 2 was released in a "Best of" collection). Season 3 and 4 were released on September 23, 2011, through the CreateSpace program. Season 5 was released shortly after on October 4. On October 6, 2011, the complete Seasons 6–8 were released through CreateSpace, and Season 9 was released in a "Best of" collection. Amazon re-released seasons 2 & 9 as complete seasons on May 9, 2014. As of February 2017, the Amazon.com releases have been discontinued. In May 2017, Nickelodeon and Paramount Home Media Distribution released Seasons 1 and 2 on DVD. In February 2018, Nickelodeon and Paramount Home Media Distribution released Seasons 3 and 4 on DVD. On May 18, 2021, Nickelodeon and Paramount Home Entertainment released Rugrats: The Complete Series on DVD.

In Australia, all seasons have been released by Beyond Home Entertainment.

Streaming 
As of March 4, 2021, all seasons of the show are available on Hulu and Paramount+.

Reception

Ratings 
In 1996, Rugrats episodes had aired 655 times over the course of the calendar year, and it remained one of cable television's most-watched series that year. In February 1996, Rugrats reached a record of 19.1 million viewers a week, becoming the highest-rated kids program on cable. In November 1996, the show surpassed itself with 20.8 million viewers a week. On November 10, 1997, the fourth-season episode "The Turkey Who Came to Dinner" became Nickelodeon's highest-rated program, with the Nielsen rating of 9.4, which totaled 3.7 million viewers among kids 2-11. On January 18, 1999, it was surpassed by the sixth-season episodes "Chuckie's Duckling" and "A Dog's Life", all of which earned a 13.8 Nielsen rating. On July 21, 2001, the series' special "All Growed Up" became Nickelodeon's highest-rated program among kids 2-11, earning a Nielsen rating of 20.4 with a 70% share. It remains as the series' highest-rated episode.

Critical reception and legacy
Since its debut in 1991, Rugrats has generally received positive reviews from critics and fans. In a 1995 interview, Steven Spielberg referred to the show as one of several shows that were the best children's programming at the time. Spielberg described Rugrats as "sort of a TV Peanuts of our time". Rugrats was also considered a strong point in Nickelodeon's rise in the 1990s. In a press release celebrating the show's 10th anniversary, Cyma Zarghami stated, "During the past decade, Rugrats has evolved from a ratings powerhouse, being the number one children's show on TV, to pop icon status. It has secured a place in the hearts of both kids and adults, who see it from their own point of view". According to Nickelodeon producers, this show made them the number-one cable channel in the 1990s. Jeff Jarvis reviewed Rugrats and stated, "When The Simpsons was a segment on The Tracey Ullman Show, it was just a belch joke with hip pretensions. As a series, it grew flesh and guts. It was my favorite cartoon. Until I discovered Nickelodeon's Rugrats, a sardonic, sly, kid's-eye view of the world that skewers thirty-something parents and Cosby kids."

Controversy
Rugrats was noteworthy among contemporary children's television for depicting observant, identifiable Jewish families. Jewish, Christian, and Muslim religious groups gave the show high praises for their special holiday episodes. Nonetheless, at one point the Anti-Defamation League and The Washington Post editorial page castigated the series for its depiction of Tommy Pickles' maternal grandparents, accusing their character designs of resembling Nazi-era depictions of Jews.

Awards and nominations

Honors

On June 28, 2001, in commemoration of their tenth anniversary, Rugrats received a star on the fabled Hollywood Walk of Fame, making it Nickelodeon's first series to receive a star. It was placed at 6600 W. Hollywood Blvd., near Cherokee Ave., outside a toy and costume shop. In the October 2001 issue of Wizard Magazine, a leading magazine for comic book fans, they released the results of the "100 Greatest Toons ever", as selected by their readers; Rugrats ranked at No. 35. Three other Nicktoons—SpongeBob SquarePants, Invader Zim, and Ren and Stimpy—also placed on the list. In a list of TV Land's "The 2000 Best Things About Television", ranking the all-time TV shows, channels, commercials, people, catch phrases, etc., Rugrats is ranked No. 699.

The original series was named the 92nd-best animated series by IGN. Angelica Pickles placed seventh in TV Guide's list of "Top 50 Greatest Cartoon Characters of All Time" in 2002. On September 24, 2013, in honor of their 60th anniversary, Rugrats earned a spot on TV Guide'''s "60 Greatest Cartoons of All Time" list. In 2017, James Charisma of Paste ranked the show's opening sequence #11 on a list of The 75 Best TV Title Sequences of All Time.

Franchise

Films

In 1998, The Rugrats Movie was released, which introduced baby Dil, Tommy's little brother, to the show. Its worldwide gross was $140.9 million against a $24 million budget, though it received mixed reviews from critics. In 2000, a sequel, Rugrats in Paris: The Movie, was released, with three new characters introduced, Kimi, Kira, and Fifi. Kimi would become Chuckie's sister and Kira would become his new mother, after marrying his father. Fifi would become Spike's new mate and Chuckie's new dog. It too was a box office success and also received a more positive critical reception. In 2003, Rugrats Go Wild was released. It was a crossover between the Rugrats and The Wild Thornberrys. It was the least successful Rugrats film both critically and commercially. The Rugrats film trilogy has grossed $299.6 million. In July 2018, Paramount announced that Rugrats would release a live-action movie on January 29, 2021. However, in November 2019, Paramount decided to pull the movie from its schedule with no explanation given.

Spin-offs and rebootRugrats Pre-School Daze, also known as Angelica and Susie's School Daze, is a spin-off that follows revolves around Angelica Pickles and Susie Carmichael as preschool students. Arlene Klasky, Gábor Csupó, and Paul Germain were its creators and executive producers. It was announced in 2001 as the first spin-off for Rugrats, and initially received a 13-episode order. Even though it was reportedly a "highly-anticipated" part of the March 2002 upfront presentation, the show was reduced to four television specials. This decision was reached after Nickelodeon shifted its focus to the All Grown Up! spin-off following the rating success of "All Growed Up". Rugrats Pre-School Daze was first shown in the United States between November 2008 and December 2008. The series carried a TV-Y parental rating, meaning that it was judged as "designed to be appropriate for all children".

In 2005, Paramount Home Entertainment released all four episodes of Rugrats Pre-School Daze on the DVDs for the Rugrats: Tales from the Crib movies. The first two were released on the Snow White DVD, while the last two were on the one for Three Jacks and a Beanstalk. The series was once available on the iTunes Store and Amazon Instant Video, but the episodes were later removed from both platforms. All episodes are available on Hulu. Variety's Brian Steinberg felt that the show's concept could be retooled as part of a Rugrats reboot, where the baby protagonists would be shown in preschool and Angelica in kindergarten.

On July 16, 2018, it was announced that Nickelodeon had given a series order to a 26-episode revival of the series, executive produced by Klasky, Csupó, and Germain. It was further announced that Paramount Pictures had greenlit a live-action/CGI hybrid feature film which was last set for a January 29, 2021 release date. Originally, it had been set for a November 13, 2020 release, and then was pushed back, with Clifford the Big Red Dog taking its old slot. But on November 12, 2019, the live-action/CGI hybrid film was removed from Paramount's release schedule. On May 14, 2020, it was announced that the reboot was delayed until 2021. The reboot premiered on Paramount+ on May 27, 2021. The reboot also began airing on Nickelodeon on August 20, 2021.

Other media
Comics

From 1998 to 2003, Nick produced a Rugrats comic strip, which was distributed through Creators Syndicate. Initially written by show-writer Scott Gray and drawn by comic book artist Steve Crespo, with Rob Armstrong as editor. Will Blyberg came on board shortly after as inker. By the end of 1998, Lee Nordling, who had joined as a contributing gag writer, took over as editor. Nordling hired extra writers, including Gordon Kent, Scott Roberts, Chuck Kim, J. Torres, Marc Bilgrey, and John Zakour, as well as new artists including Gary Fields, Tim Harkins, Vince Giaranno, and Scott Roberts. Stu Chaifetz colored the Sunday strips. The Rugrats strip started out in many papers, but as often happens with spin-off strips, soon slowed down. It is still seen in some papers in re-runs. Two paperback collections were published by Andrews McMeel It's a Jungle-Gym Out There and A Baby's Work Is Never Done.

During this time, Nickelodeon also published 30 issues of an all-Rugrats comic magazine. Most of these were edited by Frank Pittarese and Dave Roman, and featured stories and art by the comic strip creators and others. The last nine issues featured cover art by Scott Roberts, who wrote and drew many of the stories. Other writers included Roman, Chris Duffy, Patrick M. O'Connell, Joyce Mann, and Jim Spivey. Other artists included Joe Staton and Ernie Colón. The magazine also included short stories, many by Pittarese, and games, as well as reprints from an earlier, UK produced Rugrats comic.

Nick produced a special 50-page comic magazine retelling of the film Rugrats in Paris, edited by Pittarese and Roman, written by Scott Gray, pencils by Scott Roberts, and inks by Adam DeKraker.

On October 18, 2017, Boom! Studios began publishing a new Rugrats comic book series.

Video games
Nineteen video games based on the series have been released. Notably, Rugrats: Search for Reptar became one of the bestselling PlayStation games. Tommy and Angelica appear as guest characters in Rocket Power: Team Rocket Rescue. They appear again as playable characters in Nickelodeon Party Blast and Nicktoons Racing. Tommy later appears in Nicktoons Basketball in his All Grown Up! form. Rugrats characters make non-playable appearances in Nicktoons: Attack of the Toybots and Nicktoons MLB. Tommy, Angelica, and Reptar are playable characters in the official mobile game Nickelodeon Super Brawl Universe. Tommy, Angelica, and Reptar appear as playable characters in Nickelodeon Kart Racers. These same characters, along with Chuckie, are playable in Nickelodeon Kart Racers 2: Grand Prix. Reptar is a playable character in Nickelodeon All-Star Brawl. Angelica is a playable character in the Apple Arcade game Nickelodeon Extreme Tennis. Chuckie, Reptar, Purple Reptar, and Susie appear as playable characters in Nickelodeon Kart Racers 3: Slime Speedway.

Live performances

There are two live performances throughout the original series. The first show, Rugrats: A Live Adventure, premiered on February 6, 1998, at the Oakdale Theater in Wallingford, Connecticut.  The US leg of the tour ended on August 1, 1999, at Lawrence Welk Resort Center-Champagne Theatre in Branson, Missouri. Originally, the international tour of the show was going to debut on September 27, 1999, in Mara Plata, Argentina, but it was cancelled along with all South American shows. It instead had an international debut on October 28, 1999, at the Wembley Stadium in Wembley, Greater London, England. The international tour of the shows were done in the United Kingdom, Ireland, and Australia and ended on May 14, 2000, at the Adelaide Entertainment Centre in Adelaide, South Australia. Overall, the North American tours of the show ran 403 shows in 91 cities, and the international tour of the show ran in 12 cities. Despite some criticism, the show was well received from critics.

The second show, Rugrats Magic Adventure!, premiered on June 9, 2000. It ran exclusively at Universal Studios Hollywood in Los Angeles, California.

Merchandise
Merchandise that was based on Rugrats varied from video games, toothpaste, Kellogg's cereal, slippers, puzzles, pajamas, jewelry, wrapping paper, Fruit Snacks, Inflatable balls, watches, pencils, markers, cookie jars, key rings, action figures, My First Uno games, and bubblegum. The show also managed to spawn a popular merchandise line at Walmart, Kmart, Target, eBay, Hot Topic, J. C. Penney, Toys "R" Us, Mattel, Barnes & Noble, and Basic Fun. By March 1999, the franchise had generated an estimated  in merchandise sales.

The Rugrats had their own cereal made by Post called Reptar Crunch Cereal. The Rugrats and Reptar were predominantly featured on the front, there's a board game on the back and a special $3 rebate for Runaway Reptar on the side. This cereal was released for a limited time only, sold at US supermarkets 8/1/99 to 9/15/99 only, and not all supermarkets carried the cereal. To memorialize the movie, Rugrats in Paris, another Rugrats-based cereal came out in October 2000. Simply called the Rugrats in Paris Cereal, it has a similar appearance to Trix; it's a sweetened, multi-grain cereal with small-round bits in plain, red, purple and green. Small Eiffel Towers could also be seen. In 2017, entertainment retail store chain FYE began selling Reptar Cereal, as well as Reptar Bars, both based on fictional products within the show. Reptar Cereal is very similar to Froot Loops, and Reptar Bars are chocolate bars filled with green frosting, a reference to the show in which the bars would turn the tongues of whoever ate it green.Rugrats made fast-food appearances as well, with the most appearances being on Burger King. In 1994, the Hardee's fast-food chain offered a collection of Nicktoons toys as premiums that were included with kids' meals at their restaurants. All 4 Nicktoons at that time were featured — Doug, Rugrats, Ren & Stimpy, and Rocko's Modern Life. Other food items that feature Rugrats were Fruit Snacks, Macaroni and Cheese, Bubble Gum and Campbell's Rugrats Pasta with Chicken and Broth.

In their first tie-in with Burger King, 5 Rugrats toys were offered with their Kids Club meals, a different one with each meal. Each toy came with a 12-page (including covers) miniature version of Nickelodeon Magazine, which featured the toy's instructions, word search, picture puzzle, "Say What?", a scrambled word puzzle, a coupon for Oral-B Rugrats toothpaste and toothbrush, and entry blanks to subscribe to Rugrats Comic Adventures, Nick Magazine, and the Kids Club. From 1998 until 2004, Rugrats'' based-products included watches and various toys.

References

External links

Rugrats daily comic strip at Creators Syndicate

Rugrats at Don Markstein's Toonopedia. Archived from the original on February 9, 2017.
The Oral History Of ‘Nicktoons’, Part III: Exploring The Multigenerational Appeal Of ‘Rugrats’ Decider, June 16, 2016

 
1991 American television series debuts
2004 American television series endings
1990s American animated television series
1990s American animated comedy television series
2000s American animated television series
2000s American animated comedy television series
1990s Nickelodeon original programming
2000s Nickelodeon original programming
American children's animated adventure television series
American children's animated comedy television series
Animated television series about children
Animated television series about twins
Animated television series about families
Daytime Emmy Award for Outstanding Animated Program winners
English-language television shows
Nicktoons
Television series about Jews and Judaism
Television shows adapted into films
Television shows adapted into comics
Television shows adapted into video games
Television shows set in California
Television series by Klasky Csupo
Television series created by Gábor Csupó
Television series created by Arlene Klasky
Television series created by Paul Germain